Gwyn Morgan, is a director on the boards of several large corporations in Canada, including EnCana Corporation. He is also on the board of trustees of the think tank, the Fraser Institute, a director for the Manning Centre for Building Democracy and a non-executive director of HSBC. He is the former chairman of SNC-Lavalin and president and CEO of EnCana Corporation. Morgan writes a column for the business section of The Globe and Mail.

Morgan was appointed a Member of the Order of Canada on December 30, 2010.

Early years
Morgan, the youngest child in a family of four, grew up on a small grain and livestock farm near Carstairs, Alberta. His father was originally from Wales.

Education
Morgan graduated with a Bachelor of Science in Petroleum Engineering from the University of Alberta. He also has Post Graduate qualification including the Executive Business Program of Cornell University.

Career
In the 1970s, after graduating as an engineer, Morgan first worked for a Nebraska-based oil and gas company, then Alberta Energy Company (AEC), which was established in September 1973. He worked in "oil and gas exploration, production and pipelines in technical, operational, financial and management positions". By 1998, he was mentioned in Peter C. Newman's publication, Titans: How the New Canadian Establishment Seized Power, about "the new Canadian establishment", as a "promising comer to watch." By 2003, Morgan was described in a Maclean'''s magazine profile as "the most powerful man in Canada's oil patch."

Alberta Energy Company (1994-2003)
In the 1970s, after graduating as an engineer, Morgan first worked for the "Canadian subsidiary of a Nebraska-based oil and gas company" and in 1975 joined Alberta Energy Company (AEC), which was established in September 1973. When Morgan began at AEC it was during the start-up period and he was part of the founding management. He served as President and CEO from 1994 to 2003.

Encana (2003-)

Morgan founded EnCana Corporation and served as its President and Chief Executive Officer from April 2002 to December 31, 2005 and as Executive Vice Chairman from December 2005 to October 12, 2006. When Alberta Energy Corporation merged with PanCanadian Petroleum Ltd in 2002 to form EnCana,  it was, according to the University of Alberta website, "widely viewed as the most significant transaction in Canadian energy sector history." As President and CEO, in April 2002, Morgan launched EnCana Corporation's operations with former AEC staff as his management team, making the merger of the two companies more like an "AEC takeover", according to The Globe and Mail.

By September 2005, Encana had become the number one company on the Toronto Stock Exchange—the first energy company to do so since 1980.  In 2005, Morgan was listed in 9th place out of 25 in the Globe and Mail's "The Power 25", running "the continent's biggest natural gas empire, presiding over a critical commodity that powers the grid". In the wake of Hurricane Katrina, the price of gas had increased to become more valuable than oil. By 2005 when Morgan left EnCana, the company "had become North America’s leading independent oil and natural gas production company, with a stock market value of approximately $60 billion."

SNC-Lavalin

Morgan became an Independent Director of SNC-Lavalin Group Inc. on March 4, 2005 and from May 2007 through May 2013, he served as Chairman.

Canadian Council of Chief Executives
BY 2005, Morgan was director and a Vice-Chairman of the Canadian Council of Chief Executives, now known as the Business Council of Canada (BCC), which includes CEOs of 150 leading Canadian companies.

Boards of directors
Along with his service on the Boards of Directors at AEC, Encana, SNC-Lavalin, and the Canadian Council of Chief Executives, over the years Morgan has also served as director at Industry Training Authority, Noblegen Inc., the Institute of the Americas, the Council for Canadian Unity, the Fraser Institute, the Manning Centre, American Petroleum Institute, Accenture Energy Advisory Board, Rio Tinto Alcan (Also known as Alcan Inc.) and Lafarge North America Inc. Morgan served as a director of HSBC Bank Canada from December 1996 to May 2012. 

Political views
According to the Globe and Mail, by 2005 Morgan had become the "loudest voice in the oil patch trying to shout down the Kyoto Accord".

Awards and honours
Morgan was named Canada's Outstanding CEO of the Year in 2005. In 2005, he was named as Fellow of the Canadian Academy of Engineering (FCAE). According to Bloomberg, he is the "recipient of the Canadian Business Leader Award from the University of Alberta and the Ivey Business Leader Award from the University of Western Ontario, two Honorary Degrees and an inductee to the Alberta Business Hall of Fame".

In 2005 he was named as a Fellow of the Canadian Academy of Engineering (FCAE).

Public appointment commission controversy
In 2006, Morgan was appointed by Prime Minister of Canada Stephen Harper to chair the newly-established Public Appointments Commission. The appointment was rejected by opposition MPs due in part to statements Morgan had made linking refugees with crime in Canada. A May 17, 2006 article in the National Post'' criticized Morgan's opponents asking, "who but the hopelessly politically correct can deny the malign influence of violent gangs from Jamaica, Sri Lanka and East Asia on street life in Toronto, Vancouver and other Canadian urban centres?" His past role as a supporter and fundraiser for the Conservative Party of Canada was criticized as a possible conflict of interest with the commission's role of eliminating the use of public appointments for partisan patronage purposes.

Canadian Air Force
Morgan served as an Honorary Colonel of Canadian Air Force's 410 Tactical Fighter Squadron.

Personal life

Gwyn is married to Patricia Trottier. They live on Vancouver Island near Victoria, British Columbia.

References

Living people
University of Alberta alumni
HSBC people
Canadian chairpersons of corporations
Businesspeople from Alberta
Members of the Order of Canada
Fellows of the Canadian Academy of Engineering
1946 births